Ainsley Walsh (born 28 March 1996) is an Australian professional basketball player who plays for the Townsville Fire in the Women's National Basketball League.

Professional career

WNBL
Walsh made her professional debut with the Fire in 2015, looking to win her first title with the defending champions. Alongside the likes of Suzy Batkovic, Cayla George and Micaela Cocks, Walsh won her first championship and the Fire went back-to-back. Walsh has been re-signed for the 2016–17 season.

References

1996 births
Living people
Australian women's basketball players
Townsville Fire players
Sportswomen from Queensland
Sportspeople from Townsville
Guards (basketball)